Zanthoxylum hawaiiense, commonly known ae or Hawaii pricklyash, is a species of flowering plant in the family Rutaceae, that is endemic to Hawaii. It is threatened by habitat loss.  

Zanthoxylum is from the Greek ξανθὸν ξύλον, meaning "yellow wood."

This is the only genus in the citrus family (Rutaceae) with a pantropical distribution.

Zanthoxylum also colonized several Pacific Islands and the Hawaiian clade shows phylogenetic incongruence between the plastid and nuclear datasets, suggesting hybridization. The Hawaiian species are one of the rare examples of endemic Hawaiian lineages that are older than the current main islands.

References

hawaiiense
Endemic flora of Hawaii
Trees of Hawaii
Endangered plants
Taxonomy articles created by Polbot